Events from the year 1934 in Denmark.

Incumbents
 Monarch – Christian X
 Prime minister – Thorvald Stauning

Events
 15 January – The artist group Linien opens their first exhibition in Copenhagen, presenting 177 works of abstract-surrealist art.

Sports

Cycling
 Willy Funda (GER) and Hans Pützfeld (GER) wins the first Six Days of Copenhagen sox-day track cycling race.

Football
 B 93 wins their fifth Danish football championship by winning the 1933–34 Danish Championship League.

Swimming
 1219 August Denmark wins four bronze medal at the 1934 European Aquatics Championships.

Births
 24 February – Flemming Nielsen, football player (died 2018)
 11 June – Prince Henrik (died 2018)
 29 June – Henning Kronstam, ballet dancer, balletmaster, theatre director (died 1995)
 9 December – Morten Grunwald, actor (died 2018)

Deaths
 22 January – Frida Schmidt, suffragist (born 1849)
 14 February – Frederik Jensen, stage and film actor (born 1863)
 4 March – Matilde Bajer, women's rights activist and pacifist (born 1840)
 17 August – Georges Dreyer, pathologist, professor of pathology at the University of Oxford 1907–1934 (born 1863)
 8 September – Hans Munch-Petersen, scholar (born 1869)

References

 
Denmark
Years of the 20th century in Denmark
1930s in Denmark
1934 in Europe